Hard Times for Lovers is the twelfth studio album by American singer and songwriter Judy Collins, released by Elektra Records in 1979.

This was Collins' first new recording since Bread and Roses in 1976; it earned some extra publicity as a result of the back cover of the Francesco Scavullo-photographed sleeve art, depicting most of a nude Collins as seen from the back. The album was still something of a commercial disappointment, however, peaking at No. 54 on the Billboard Pop Albums charts.

Track listing
 "Hard Times for Lovers" (Hugh Prestwood) – 3:56
 "Marie" (Randy Newman) – 3:11
 "Happy End" (Henry Gaffney) – 3:12
 "Desperado" (Glenn Frey, Don Henley) – 3:34
 "I Remember Sky" (Stephen Sondheim) – 4:00
 "Starmaker" (Bruce Roberts, Carole Bayer Sager) – 4:28
 "Dorothy" (Hugh Prestwood) – 4:37
 "I'll Never Say Goodbye" (Theme from the Universal Picture The Promise) (Alan Bergman, Marilyn Bergman, David Shire) – 3:41
 "Through the Eyes of Love" (Theme from Ice Castles) (Marvin Hamlisch, Carole Bayer Sager) – 3:28
 "Where or When" (Lorenz Hart, Richard Rodgers) – 3:38

Personnel
Judy Collins – vocals, guitar, piano
Jeff Baxter – guitar, pedal steel
Dennis Budimir – guitar
Norton Buffalo – harmonica
Gary Coleman – percussion
Hilda Harris – background vocals
Cissy Houston – background vocals
David Hungate – bass
Jim Keltner – drums
Mike Lang – piano
Dean Parks – guitar
Lee Ritenour – guitar
Maretha Stewart – background vocals
Fred Tackett – guitar
Jai Winding – piano, keyboards
David Wolfert – guitar, arranger
Sid Sharp – strings, concertmaster
Harry Bluestone – strings, concertmaster

Production notes
Produced by Gary Klein
Charles Koppelman – executive producer
Arranged and conducted by Lee Holdridge and  Nick DeCaro
Frank DeCaro - Music Contractor and Album Supervisor
Linda Gerrity – production coordination
Art direction by Nancy Greenberg
Mastered by Bernie Grundman and Zal Schreiber
Assistant Engineering by Pete Lewis, Linda Tyler, Don Henderson
Engineer, remixing by John Mills, Armin Steiner
Photography by Francesco Scavullo

References

Judy Collins albums
1979 albums
Albums arranged by Lee Holdridge
Albums produced by Gary Klein (producer)
Elektra Records albums